Sigma Tauri (σ Tauri) is the Bayer designation for a pair of white-hued stars in the zodiac constellation of Taurus. The system is a visual double star, whose components are designated σ1 Tauri and σ2 Tauri, with the latter being the more northerly star. The two are separated by 7.2 arcminutes on the sky and can be readily split with a pair of binoculars. They have apparent visual magnitudes of +5.07 and +4.70, respectively, which indicates they are both visible to the naked eye. Based upon parallax measurements, σ1 Tauri is about 147 light years from the Sun, while σ2 Tauri is 156 light years distant.

σ1 Tauri is a single-lined spectroscopic binary star system with an orbital period of 38.951 days and an eccentricity of 0.15. The visible component is an Am star with a stellar classification of A4m, indicating it is chemically peculiar A-type star. It is spinning with a projected rotational velocity of 56.5 km/s. The star has 1.9 times the mass of the Sun and is radiating 14.7 times the Sun's luminosity from its photosphere at an effective temperature of 8,470 K. Although it lies in the general direction of the Hyades cluster, based on parallax measurements it has been excluded from the list of candidate members.

σ2 Tauri is a solitary A-type main sequence star with a stellar classification of A5 Vn. The 'n' suffix indicates the lines are "nebulous" due to rapid rotation, and indeed it is spinning with a projected rotational velocity of 128 km/s. The star is an estimated 258 million years old, with 1.7 times the mass of the Sun. It is radiating 22.5 times the Sun's luminosity from its photosphere at an effective temperature of around 8,165 K. The star is considered a member of the Hyades cluster.

In Chinese astronomy, σ2 Tauri is called 附耳, Pinyin: Fùěr, meaning Whisper, because this star is marking itself and stands alone in the Whisper asterism of the Net mansion (see : Chinese constellation).

References

Am stars
Binary stars
A-type main-sequence stars
Hyades (star cluster)
Tauri, Sigma
Taurus (constellation)
Durchmusterung objects
Tauri, 091 2
029479 88
021673 83
1478 9